Percy James Patrick Kent-Smith (born 20 August 1943), known professionally as Sylvester McCoy, is a Scottish actor. Gaining prominence as a physical comedian, he became best known for playing the seventh incarnation of the Doctor in the long-running science fiction television series Doctor Who from 1987 to 1989—the final Doctor of the original run—and briefly returning in a television film in 1996. He is also known for his work as Radagast in The Hobbit film series (2012–2014).

Early life
McCoy was born Percy James Patrick Kent-Smith in Dunoon, on the Cowal peninsula, to an Irish Catholic mother and an English father who had been killed in action in World War II a couple of months before McCoy was born. He was brought up by his Catholic maternal grandmother and aunts and met his father's family at the age of 17. He later described himself as an atheist.

He was brought up primarily in Dunoon, where he attended Saint Mun's School; he then studied for the priesthood at Blairs College, a seminary in Aberdeen between the ages of 12 and 16, but gave this up and continued his education at Dunoon Grammar School. After school he moved to London where he worked in the insurance industry for five years. He worked in the box office of The Roundhouse for a time, where he was discovered by Ken Campbell.

Career

Early work
McCoy came to prominence as a member of the experimental theatre troupe "The Ken Campbell Roadshow". His best known act was as a stuntman character called "Sylveste McCoy" in a play entitled An Evening with Sylveste McCoy (the name was coined by actor Brian Murphy, part of the Roadshow at the time), where his stunts included putting a fork and nails up his nose and stuffing ferrets down his trousers, and setting his head on fire. As a joke, the programme notes listed Sylveste McCoy as played by "Sylveste McCoy" and, after a reviewer missed the joke and assumed that Sylveste McCoy was a real person, Kent-Smith adopted this as his stage name. Some years later, McCoy added an "r" to the end of "Sylveste", in part because of the actors' superstition that a stage name with thirteen letters was unlucky.

Notable television appearances before he gained the role of the Doctor included roles in Vision On (where he played Pepe/Epep, a character who lived in the mirror), an O-Man in Jigsaw and Tiswas. Every episode of the innovative ATV schools maths programme Leapfrog featured Sylveste (sic) as "Bert" in wordless sequences filmed out of doors, as he attempted to form regular geometric patterns from different numbers of logs or carpet squares. He also appeared in Eureka, often suffering from the inventions of Wilf Lunn and as Wart, assistant to StarStrider in the CITV series of the same name. McCoy also portrayed, in one-man shows on the stage, two famous movie comedians: Stan Laurel and Buster Keaton. He also appeared as Henry "Birdie" Bowers in the 1985 television serial about Scott's last Antarctic expedition, The Last Place on Earth.

McCoy also had a small role in the 1979 film Dracula opposite Laurence Olivier and Donald Pleasence, and has sung with the Welsh National Opera.

Doctor Who

McCoy became the Seventh Doctor after taking over the lead role in Doctor Who in 1987 from Colin Baker. He remained on the series until it ended in 1989, ending with Survival (his twelfth and final serial as the Doctor). As Baker declined the invitation to film the regeneration scene, McCoy briefly wore a wig and appeared, face-down until the last moment before the regeneration commenced as the Sixth Doctor, with his face concealed by regeneration special effects. He played the Doctor in the 1993 charity special Dimensions in Time, and again in 1996, appearing in the beginning of the Doctor Who television movie starring Paul McGann as the Eighth Doctor.

In his first series, McCoy, a comedy actor, portrayed the character with a degree of clown-like humour, but script editor Andrew Cartmel soon changed that when fans argued that the character (and plots) were becoming increasingly lightweight. The Seventh Doctor developed into a much darker figure than any of his earlier incarnations, manipulating people like chess pieces and always seeming to be playing a deeper game. A distinguishing feature of McCoy's performances was his manner of speech. He used his natural Scottish accent and rolled his rs. At the start of his tenure he used proverbs and sayings adapted to his own ends (e.g. "There's many a slap twixt cup and lap" – Delta and the Bannermen), although this characteristic was phased out during the later, darker series of his tenure. In 1990, readers of Doctor Who Magazine voted McCoy's Doctor "Best Doctor", over perennial favourite Tom Baker. Since 1999 he has continued acting in the role of the Seventh Doctor in a series of audio plays for Big Finish Productions.

In November 2013 McCoy co-starred in the one-off 50th anniversary comedy homage The Five(ish) Doctors Reboot.

In January 2021, McCoy returned to the role of the Doctor alongside Bonnie Langford as Mel Bush, in "A Business Proposal for Mel!" This short, acted as an announcement trailer for 'The Collection: Season 24' Blu-Ray set, which was released later that year.

McCoy reprised the role of the Doctor in the 2022 special "The Power of the Doctor".

Later work
McCoy's television roles since Doctor Who have included Michael Sams in the 1997 drama Beyond Fear, shown on the first night of broadcast of Channel 5. In 1988, while still appearing in Doctor Who, McCoy presented a BBC children's programme called What's Your Story?, in which viewers were invited to phone in suggestions for the continuation of an ongoing drama.

He has also acted extensively in theatre in productions as diverse as pantomime and Molière. He played Grandpa Jock in John McGrath's A Satire of the Four Estaites (1996) at the Edinburgh Festival. He played the role of Snuff in the macabre BBC Radio 4 comedy series The Cabaret of Dr Caligari.

McCoy missed out on a role in Pirates of the Caribbean: The Curse of the Black Pearl and was the second choice to play the role of Bilbo Baggins in Peter Jackson's The Lord of the Rings film trilogy. In 1991, he presented the Doctor Who video documentary release The Hartnell Years showcasing selected episodes of missing stories from the First Doctor's era.

McCoy appeared as the lawyer Dowling in a BBC Production of Henry Fielding's novel, The History of Tom Jones, A Foundling.
In 2001 he appeared in Paul Sellar's asylum comedy "The Dead Move Fast" at the Gilded Balloon as part of the Edinburgh Festival Fringe, playing the role of Doctor Mallinson. In 2012 he played the part of the suicidal Mr. Peters in JC Marshall's play, Plume, at the Tron Theatre in Glasgow.

McCoy has appeared with the Royal Shakespeare Company in The Lion, the Witch, and the Wardrobe and in King Lear in 2007, playing the Fool to Ian McKellen's Lear, a performance which made use of McCoy's ability to play the spoons. The RSC production with McKellen and McCoy was staged in Melbourne, during late July/early August 2007 and Wellington and Auckland, New Zealand, during mid to late August 2007. It came into residence at the New London Theatre in late 2007, ending its run in January 2008. He reprised the role for the 2008 television movie of the production.

In May 2008 he performed with the Carl Rosa Opera Company in a production of Gilbert and Sullivan's The Mikado, playing the title role. He only performed with the company briefly, for the week of the show's run performing at the Sheffield Lyceum. Despite being set in Japan, he was able to demonstrate his ability to play the spoons by using his fan. In 2009 McCoy played the character of Mr. Mushnik in the Chocolate Factory's production of Little Shop of Horrors.

He has also made guest appearances in the television series The Bill, the Rab C. Nesbitt episode "Father" as Rab's mentally ill brother Gash Sr. and the Still Game episode "Oot" (AKA "Out"), where he played a hermit-type character adjusting to life in modern Glasgow, having remained in his house for over 30 years.  In October 2008, he had a minor guest role as an injured ventriloquist on Casualty.  In the same month McCoy guest starred in an episode of the BBC soap opera Doctors, playing an actor who once played the time-travelling hero of a children's television series called "The Amazing Lollipop Man". The role was written as a tribute to McCoy.

In January and February 2016, McCoy appeared in the three-part BBC series The Real Marigold Hotel, which followed a group of celebrity senior citizens including Miriam Margolyes and Wayne Sleep on a journey to India.

In 2017 he returned to the stage at the Edinburgh Fringe, in the production A Joke alongside Star Trek:Voyager actor Robert Picardo.

Video games
McCoy returned to the role of the Seventh Doctor in 1997, recording new audio for the video game Doctor Who: Destiny of the Doctors.

The Hobbit trilogy
McCoy began filming for The Hobbit, A three-part adaptation of the book, in 2011. He portrays the wizard Radagast, alongside fellow King Lear actor Ian McKellen who reprises his role as Gandalf.

Although the character of Radagast is only alluded to in The Hobbit, and only a minor character in The Lord of the Rings, the part was expanded for the films.

Personal life
McCoy and his wife, Agnes Verkaik, have two sons: Sam (born 1976), a 3D artist who worked on the Doctor Who video game Return to Earth, and Joe (born 1977). They both appeared in the Doctor Who serial The Curse of Fenric as Haemovores, although their scenes were deleted from the finished release. According to McCoy, his sons live in Holland and Thailand.

During the COVID-19 pandemic, McCoy spent some of lockdown living in France.

Filmography

Film

Television

Short films

Stage

Audio drama

Direct to video

Video games

References

External links

 

1943 births
20th-century Scottish male actors
21st-century Scottish male actors
Living people
People educated at Dunoon Grammar School
People from Dunoon
Royal Shakespeare Company members
Scottish atheists
Scottish male comedians
Scottish male film actors
Scottish male radio actors
Scottish male Shakespearean actors
Scottish male stage actors
Scottish male television actors
Scottish people of English descent
Scottish people of Irish descent
Scottish people of Northern Ireland descent